Calanthe triplicata commonly known as the common Christmas orchid is a plant in the orchid family and is native to Oceania, Asia, and the islands of eastern Africa. It is a terrestrial orchid that grows in clumps with crowded pseudobulbs, dark green corrugated leaves and up to forty white flowers. The sepals and petals are similar to each other and the labellum has three spreading lobes and a yellow callus.

Description
The leaf veins are more or less parallel with between six and nine more prominent than the rest. Flowering occurs from October to February in Australia and in April and May in China.

Taxonomy and naming
The common Christmas orchid was first formally described in 1796 by (Pierre) Remi Willemet, who gave it the name Orchis triplicata and published the description in Paul Usteri's book Annalen der Botanick. In 1907, Oakes Ames changed the name to Calanthe triplicata. The specific epithet (triplicata) is derived from the Latin prefix tris meaning "thrice" and plicatus meaning "folded".

Distribution and habitat
Calanthe triplicata is found in Mauritius, Madagascar, Seychelles, Assam, eastern Himalayas, southern India, Sri Lanka, Myanmar, Thailand, Malaysia, Laos, Cambodia, south China, Vietnam, Borneo, Java, Lesser Sunda Islands, Moluccas, Philippines, Sulawesi, Sumatra, Bismark Islands, New Guinea, Solomon Islands, Australia, Fiji, New Caledonia, Samoa, Vanuatu, Wallis and Futuna, Marquesas, Santa Cruz Islands, Caroline Islands, the Marianas Islands, Taiwan, Ryukyu Islands. In Australia it occurs between the Iron Range in Queensland and the Illawarra in New South Wales as well as on Norfolk Island and Lord Howe Island. It grows in evergreen broad-leaved forests, rainforests and other wet forests in dense shade.

Gallery

References

triplicata
Orchids of Asia
Orchids of Oceania
Orchids of Malaya
Orchids of Assam
Orchids of Myanmar
Orchids of Borneo
Orchids of Cambodia
Orchids of China
Orchids of India
Orchids of Japan
Orchids of Java
Orchids of Laos
Orchids of Madagascar
Orchids of Malaysia
Orchids of New Caledonia
Orchids of New Guinea
Orchids of New South Wales
Orchids of the Philippines
Orchids of Queensland
Orchids of Sumatra
Orchids of Sri Lanka
Orchids of Taiwan
Orchids of Thailand
Orchids of Vietnam
Flora of Fiji
Flora of Mauritius
Flora of the Ryukyu Islands
Flora of Seychelles
Flora of Samoa
Flora of Sulawesi
Flora of Vanuatu
Plants described in 1796